The Coptic cross is any of a number of Christian cross variants associated in some way with Coptic Christians.

Typical form 
The typical form of the "Coptic cross" used in the Coptic Church is made up of two bold lines of equal length that intersect at the middle at right angles. Each line terminates in three points, representing the Trinity of the Father, the Son, and the Holy Spirit. Altogether, the cross has 12 points symbolizing the Apostles, whose mission was to spread the Gospel message throughout the world.

This form of Coptic cross is widely used in the Coptic church and the Ethiopian and Eritrean churches, and so this form of the cross may also be called the "Ethiopian cross" or "Axum cross". Bertran de la Farge dates it to the 4th century and cites it as a predecessor of the Occitan cross.

History and variation 

Old Coptic crosses often incorporate a circle, as in the form called a "Coptic cross" by Rudolf Koch in his The Book of Signs (1933). Sometimes the arms of the cross extend through the circle (dividing it into four quadrants), as in the "Celtic cross".

In 1984, a modern variant of the Coptic Cross composed of three bars intersecting at right angles in three dimensions was given as a gift by the Coptic Orthodox Church and mounted on the top of the All Africa Conference of Churches building since the Coptic Church is considered to be the mother church in Africa.

Popular culture 
Many Copts have the cross tattooed as a sign of faith on the inside of their right arm at the wrist.

One of the forms of the Coptic cross, which is referred to as the Ethiopian Coptic cross, was worn by Stevie Ray Vaughan. Keith Richards also wears an Ethiopian Coptic Cross.

Gallery

See also 
 Alexandrian rite

References

External links 
 About.com entry on crosses
 Funerary stele featuring a Coptic cross

Coptic Orthodox Church
Crosses by culture
Tattooing and religion
Christian crosses